Paul Magdalino FBA (born 10 May 1948) is the Bishop Wardlaw Professor of Byzantine History in the University of St Andrews, professor of Byzantine history at Koç University, Istanbul; and a Fellow of the British Academy.

His research interests include Byzantine history: the society, culture and economy of the Byzantine world from 6th to 13th centuries; the city of Constantinople; prophecy, scientific thought, the formation of Byzantine religious Orthodoxy. He is well known for his monograph on the Byzantine Empire during the reign of Manuel I Komnenos (1143–1180), which challenged Niketas Choniates' negative appraisal of the ruler. Magdalino received the 1993 Runciman Award for his work.

Biography

Magdalino was educated at the University of Oxford (1970 BA, 1976 D.Phil.). He has worked as a lecturer and reader in Mediaeval history in University of St Andrews (1977–1999), as a Bishop Wardlaw Professor of Byzantine History in the University of St Andrews (1999–2009), and as a professor of history at Koç University, Istanbul (from 2005).

He is a fellow of: Dumbarton Oaks Center for Byzantine Studies; Andrew W. Mellon Foundation in Early Christian Humanism, Catholic University of America; Alexander-von-Humboldt Stipendium at Frankfurt and Munich; Humanities Research Centre at Australian National University. He is Directeur d'études invité, École des Hautes Études en Sciences Sociales, Directeur d’études invité, École pratique des Hautes Études, section des sciences religieuses.

He was a visiting professor of history at Harvard University in 1995–1996. In 2002 he was elected Fellow of the British Academy.

Magdalino is a member of several editorial boards and research committees: 'The Medieval Mediterranean' at Brill monograph series; 'Oxford Studies in Byzantium' at Oxford University Press; Committee for the British Academy project on the Prosopography of the Byzantine Empire; Senior Fellows Committee at Dumbarton Oaks Center for Byzantine Studies; La Pomme d’or Publishing; Byzantinische Zeitschrift journal.

Publications

Books as author

 (with Clive Foss) Rome and Byzantium  (Oxford, 1976).
 Tradition and Transformation in Medieval Byzantium (Aldershot, 1991).
 The Empire of Manuel I Komnenos, 1143-1180 (Cambridge, 1993), pp.xxvi+527, winner of the 1993 Runciman Award.
 Constantinople médiévale. Études sur  l'évolution des structures urbaines, Travaux et Mémoires, Monographies 9 (Paris, 1996) pp. 117; Serbian translation, Belgrade 2001.
 The Byzantine Background to the First Crusade, Canadian Institute of Balkan Studies (Toronto, 1996) pp.38
 L’orthodoxie des astrologues. La science entre le dogme et la divination à Byzance (VIIe-XIVe siècle), Réalités byzantines 12 (Paris, 2006), pp. 194.
 Studies on the History and Topography of Byzantine Constantinople (Variorum, Ashgate, Aldershot 2007).
 (with Nelson, Robert S.) The Old Testament in Byzantium (Harvard University Press 2010).

Books as editor

 The Perception of the Past in Twelfth-Century Europe (London, 1992) pp.x+240.
 New Constantines: the Rhythm of Imperial Renewal in Byzantine History, 4th-13th Centuries (Aldershot, 1994) pp.x+312.
 (ed. with D. Ricks) Byzantium and the Modern Greek Identity  (Aldershot, 1998) pp.x+187
 Byzantium in the Year 1000 (Leiden, 2003), pp. xx+284
 (ed. with Maria Mavroudi) The Occult Sciences in Byzantium (Geneva, 2007) pp. 468.
 The Incineration of New Babylon: The Fire Poem of Konstantinos Stilbes (Geneva, 2015)

References

External links
 Paul Magdalino's page at La Pomme d'or Publishing
 Paul Magdalino's page at British Academy
 Research Associates of the Institute of Medieval Studies at the University of St Andrews

British Byzantinists
Academics of the University of St Andrews
Alumni of Oriel College, Oxford
1948 births
Living people
Fellows of the British Academy
Academic staff of Koç University
Scholars of Byzantine history